Kalle Bask is a Finnish sailor. He competed at the 2012 Summer Olympics in the 49er class, with helmsman Lauri Lehtinen.

References

Finnish male sailors (sport)
Year of birth missing (living people)
Living people
Olympic sailors of Finland
Sailors at the 2012 Summer Olympics – 49er